Otto Wilhelmsson Furuhjelm (1 June 1819 – 24 May 1883) was a Russian lieutenant-general of Finnish descent.

Furuhjelm graduated from the Finnish Cadets Corps, and in 1839, enrolled the Life-Guards Semenovskiy Regiment (Семёновский лейб-гвардии полк). He was promoted to colonel in 1854, and was made the commander of the Yekaterinoslavsky Grenadeer Regiment at Yekaterinoslav (Екатеринославский гренадерский полк) in 1855. In 1858, he took charge of the Tavrichesky Grenadeer Regiment. In 1863, Otto Furuhjelm was promoted to the rank of mayor-general and commanded the Litovsky Regiment. In 1867, he was promoted to chief of the inspector's headquarters of rifle battalions (начальник штаба инспектора стрелковых батальонов). In this position, Otto W. Furuhjelm contributed to the rearmament of the Imperial Russian Army and earned the rank of lieutenant-general in 1871. He retired in late 1882.

See also
 Johan Hampus Furuhjelm
 Karl Harald Felix Furuhjelm

External links and references
 
 Helsinki kehyksissä - Käyttäjälle - Furuhjelm - Kuva 1

1819 births
1883 deaths
People from Turku
People from Turku and Pori Province (Grand Duchy of Finland)
Swedish-speaking Finns
Imperial Russian Army generals
Russian people of the January Uprising
19th-century Finnish people